Philippa, Lady Perry ( Fairclough; born 1957), is a British psychotherapist and author. She has written the graphic novel Couch Fiction: A Graphic Tale of Psychotherapy (2010), How to Stay Sane (2012), and The Book You Wish Your Parents Had Read (and Your Children Will be Glad That You Did) (2019).

Early life
Lady Perry was born in Warrington, Cheshire. Her mother's family owned a cotton mill and her father inherited a civil engineering company and a farm. She suffered from dyslexia and was educated at Abbots Bromley School for Girls and at a Swiss finishing school where she learnt to ski.

She worked as a litigation clerk, an enquiry agent, and a McDonald's employee. She went to Middlesex Polytechnic where she gained a degree in Fine Art as a mature student.

Work
In 1985 she trained and volunteered for the Samaritans, after which she trained as a psychotherapist. Perry worked in the mental health field for 20 years, 10 in private practice, before being published. From 2010 she spent time on the faculty of The School of Life, but she has subsequently discontinued this.

She had a regular column about psychotherapy in Psychologies Magazine for two years; in September 2013 she became Red Magazine'''s agony aunt. She also works as a freelance journalist specialising in psychology and was an occasional presenter for The Culture Show on BBC Two.

Perry has presented various documentaries including: Sex Lies and Lovebites: The Agony Aunt Story (BBC Four); Being Bipolar (Channel 4); The Truth About Children Who Lie (BBC Radio 4); and The Great British Sex Survey (Channel 4).

In 2010 the academic publisher, Palgrave Macmillan, published Perry's book, Couch Fiction: A Graphic Tale of Psychotherapy. It is a graphic novel that tells a tale of a psychotherapist and her client, from both their perspectives. Underneath the graphic novel boxes, Perry takes the position of commentator and provides footnotes on what might be going on between them and what theories the therapist is drawing on or should be drawing on. There is an afterword by Andrew Samuels.

Perry is a monthly Agony Aunt for Red magazine, and since Sunday 20 June 2021, for The Observer.  She appeared on BBC Radio 4's The Museum of Curiosity in November 2019. Her hypothetical donation to this imaginary museum was "A swarm of fruit flies".

Politics
In April 2016 Perry announced her support for the Women's Equality Party.

Publications
BooksCouch Fiction: a Graphic Tale of psychotherapy. Palgrave Macmillan, 2010. With an afterword by Andrew Samuels.How to Stay Sane. The School of Life Self Help Series. Pan Macmillan, 2012. Edited by Alain de Botton.The Book You Wish Your Parents Had Read (and Your Children Will be Glad That You Did).'' London: Penguin, 2019.

Articles
  Preview.
  Preview.

Personal life
She is married to the artist Sir Grayson Perry, and they have a daughter, Florence, born in 1992. The Perrys live in London. She has often been asked what it is like being married to a transvestite and says, "Being the wife of a trannie is great, he always makes me look fantastic". When asked the same question by a Buckingham Palace Press Officer when the Perrys went to a reception there in 2005, she said, "As obsessions go, it's better than football".

References

External links
 

Living people
1957 births
British psychotherapists
British graphic novelists
British comics artists
English writers
Psychology writers
People educated at Abbots Bromley School for Girls
Alumni of Middlesex University
English women novelists
The School of Life people
Women's Equality Party people
British female comics artists
Female comics writers
British advice columnists
British women columnists
Wives of knights